Dichorisandra is a genus of perennial monocotyledonous flowering plants in the dayflower family (Commelinaceae). It is found in the Neotropics. The genus is characterised by its slightly zygomorphic flowers with large anthers usually releasing pollen by means of pores at the apex, as well as by its seeds that are embedded in a red or sometimes white aril, and tubers that often form at the tips of the roots. Both morphology and an analysis of DNA sequences indicate it is very closely related to the genus Siderasis.

 Species
 Dichorisandra acaulis Cogn. - Bahia
 Dichorisandra alba Seub. & Warm. - Minas Gerais
 Dichorisandra amabilis J.R.Grant - southern Mexico, Central America
 Dichorisandra angustifolia L.Linden & Rodigas - Ecuador
 Dichorisandra begoniifolia Kunth - southern Brazil
 Dichorisandra bonitana Philipson - Ecuador, Colombia
 Dichorisandra conglomerata Aona & M.C.E.Amaral - Bahia
 Dichorisandra densiflora Ule - northwestern Brazil
 Dichorisandra diederichsanae Steyerm. - Guyana, Venezuela
 Dichorisandra fluminensis Brade - Rio de Janeiro
 Dichorisandra foliosa Kunth - eastern Brazil
 Dichorisandra gaudichaudiana Kunth - Brazil
 Dichorisandra glaziovii Taub. - southern Brazil
 Dichorisandra gracilis Nees & Mart - eastern Brazil
 Dichorisandra hexandra (Aubl.) Standl. - widespread from southern Mexico to Argentina
 Dichorisandra hirtella Mart.  - eastern Brazil
 Dichorisandra incurva Mart. - Brazil
 Dichorisandra interrupta Mart. - eastern Brazil
 Dichorisandra jardimii Aona & M.C.E.Amaral - Bahia
 Dichorisandra leonii Aona & M.C.E.Amaral - Minas Gerais
 Dichorisandra leucophthalmos Hook. - southern Brazil
 Dichorisandra macrophylla Gleason - Minas Gerais
 Dichorisandra micans C.B.Clarke - Minas Gerais
 Dichorisandra mosaica Linden ex K.Koch - Peru
 Dichorisandra neglecta Brade - Espírito Santo
 Dichorisandra nutabilis Aona & M.C.E.Amaral - Espírito Santo
 Dichorisandra ordinatiflora Aona & Faden - Bahia
 Dichorisandra oxypetala Hook. - southern Brazil
 Dichorisandra paranaensis D.Maia, Cervi & Tardivo - Paraná
 Dichorisandra penduliflora Kunth - eastern Brazil
 Dichorisandra perforans C.B.Clarke  - Brazil
 Dichorisandra picta G.Lodd. - southern Brazil
 Dichorisandra procera Mart. - eastern Brazil
 Dichorisandra puberula Nees & Mart. - eastern Brazil
 Dichorisandra pubescens Mart. - southeastern Brazil
 Dichorisandra radicalis Nees & Mart. - Minas Gerais
 Dichorisandra reginae (L.Linden & Rodigas) H.E.Moore - Peru
 Dichorisandra rhizophya Mart. - eastern Brazil
 Dichorisandra rupicola Aona & M.C.E.Amaral - Minas Gerais
 †Dichorisandra saundersii Hook.f. - Brazil but extinct
 Dichorisandra tenuior Mart.  - southern Brazil
 Dichorisandra thyrsiflora J.C.Mikan - southeastern Brazil; naturalized in Peru + Java
 Dichorisandra ulei J.F.Macbr. - Peru, Ecuador
 Dichorisandra variegata Aona & Faden - Bahia
 Dichorisandra velutina Aona & M.C.E.Amaral - Espírito Santo
 Dichorisandra villosula Mart. - Brazil, Venezuela, Bolivia

References

 
 

Commelinaceae
Commelinales genera